The 109th edition of the Paris–Tours cycling classic was held on 11 October 2015. The race was part of the 2015 UCI Europe Tour, ranked as a 1.HC event. 

Italian rider Matteo Trentin won the race in a three-man sprint with Belgians Tosh Van der Sande and Greg Van Avermaet.

Teams
Twenty-three teams started the race. Each team had a maximum of eight riders:

Results

References

External links
Official website

2015 UCI Europe Tour
Paris–Tours
Paris-Tours
Paris-Tours